Free Style is a 2008 coming-of-age film about an 18-year-old young man (Corbin Bleu), who is devoted to his family, and finds love and himself in his quest to win the Amateur National Motocross Championship. Free Style is directed by William Dear (Angels in the Outfield, Harry and the Hendersons).

Plot

Cale Bryant is a young man who delves deeper into his passion, debuting in the world of Motocross.

Now that he is an adult, he decides to choose his own future, for once, independently, to help him become a champion with the support of parents and his girlfriend.

After hard training, Cale decides to enroll in the National Championship for amateur motocross, convinced that he can win. In the last race, Cale is in the lead until the last lap where his bike breaks down. Cale beats his arch rival Derek Black by pushing his bike across the finish line but is disqualified for pushing his bike across the line. Derek celebrates his victory until it is revealed that Derek had been disqualified for causing a wreck and Cale will receive the pro contract for next season.

Cast
 Corbin Bleu as Cale Bryant
 Sandra Echeverría as Alex Lopez
 Madison Pettis as Bailey Bryant
 David Reivers as Dell Bryant
 Matt Bellefleur as Derek Black
 Jesse Moss as Justin Maynard
 Penelope Ann Miller as Jeannette Bryant
 Martin Rattigan as Coby
 Kelly Small as Sam

Critical reception
Free Style garnered negative reviews from critics.

Mike Hale of The New York Times noted that the film initially sets itself up as being "jumpy, noisy, cheerful, a sort of "High School X-Games Musical." But said that despite the "shamelessly pandering finish", it comes across as a "surprisingly old-fashioned tale of small-town striving" with some "perfunctorily filmed" racing scenes. S. Jhoanna Robledo of Common Sense Media said that despite Bleu's efforts with the movie's "heavier themes" and having "poignant" scenes with Pettis, she felt the plot was "better suited for an after-school special than a big-screen treatment." Elizabeth Weitzman of the New York Daily News wrote that: "Though the film deserves credit for its depiction of economic hardship, almost everything else is handled clumsily. And why would a movie about motocross spend so little time on the track? Bleu remains one to watch, but only real fans will want to watch this."

Roger Ebert wrote that: "There are some charming actors in this movie, all dressed up but with no place to go. "Free Style" is remorselessly formulaic, with every character and plot point playing its assigned role." Kyle Smith of the New York Post criticized the film for its "[I]nsistent, numbing niceness combine[s] with sloppily edited motocross footage" and added that: "Bleu's cute-but-bland act flatlines in every scene of a movie with a script that is a perfect match for his abilities." Scott Tobias of The A.V. Club gave the movie a "D" grade, criticizing Dear's filmmaking style, saying "his signature bland semi-competence is all over Free Style, which desperately needs some flash of style and forward momentum." Entertainment Weekly writer Adam Markovitz gave the film a "D+" grade, criticizing Bleu's performance for being "bland and painfully earnest" and felt the formulaic plot "unfolds just the way you think it will…until the climax turns out to be even cheesier than you feared."

References

External links
 
 
 

2008 films
2008 drama films
2000s English-language films
American auto racing films
American drama films
Films directed by William Dear
Films shot in Vancouver
Motorcycle racing films
Samuel Goldwyn Films films
2000s American films